The Birmingham Stallions were a franchise in the United States Football League, an attempt to establish a second professional league of American football in the United States in competition with the National Football League.  They played their home games at Birmingham, Alabama's Legion Field.  They competed in all three USFL seasons, 1983–1985.  During their run, they were one of the USFL's more popular teams, and seemed to have a realistic chance of being a viable venture had the USFL been better run.

The owner was Cincinnati financier and Birmingham native Marvin Warner. The team's coach was Rollie Dotsch, who was previously the offensive line coach of the Pittsburgh Steelers during its Super Bowl years and ended up with the second most wins in USFL history. The Stallions starting quarterback for their final two seasons was Cliff Stoudt, a long-time backup to Terry Bradshaw with the Steelers.  Stoudt had finally taken over for the injured Bradshaw in 1983 and had played very well for the first half of the season, but his game fell apart in the second half of the season, leading Steeler fans to harshly turn on him. After the season, Stoudt quickly decided it was not worth staying in Pittsburgh and signed with the Stallions.  (Amusingly, the expansion Pittsburgh Maulers' lone sellout was the game where Cliff Stoudt returned to Pittsburgh. Steeler fans pelted the hated Stoudt with snowballs throughout the game, but Stoudt and Birmingham won, 30–18.)

In Birmingham, Stoudt proved to be an excellent QB, finishing in the league's top 5 in 1984 and 1985, among such peers as Jim Kelly and Chuck Fusina and leading the team to two divisional titles. The Stallions also added Bills star HB Joe Cribbs in 1984.  Cribbs led the league in rushing in 1984 and finished 6th in 1985. Former Steeler WR Jim Smith was another of the team's stars. Many other Stallions players would play in the NFL once the USFL went out of existence.

1983 season
Warner was initially slated to be the owner of the USFL's Washington franchise–what became the Washington Federals. However, when he learned that the USFL was putting a franchise in his hometown, he jumped at it.

The Stallions scrambled to put a roster together after training camp and signed or claimed approximately 20 players via trades or waivers in the week prior to their first game.  However, Dotsch managed to mold them into a fairly competitive team that finished 9-9.

Although the team made a splash in signing their first-round draft pick, quarterback Reggie Collier out of Southern Mississippi, the remainder of the Stallions consisted of mostly unsung former NFL reserves and college free agents.

One of the few the pro veterans signed center Tom Banks (a Birmingham native), who spent ten seasons with the St. Louis Cardinals.  Banks played 116 NFL games (starting 63) while with the Cardinals and was brought in by coach Rollie Dotsch to serve as a mentor to a very young club.  Banks eventually retired after the 1984 Stallions' season and became an assistant coach on the Birmingham staff in 1985.

Other NFL veterans who signed with the Stallions included former Kansas City Chief RB Earl Gant (2 years, 20 games with the Chiefs), RB Ken Talton (1 year, 2 games with the Lions), WR/KR Kevin Miller (3 years, 20 games with the Vikings), TE Steve Stephens (1 year, 16 games with the Jets), OT Robert Woods (8 years, 99 games with the Jets and Saints), OG Buddy Aydelette (1 year, 9 games with the Packers), DE Mike Raines (7 years, 104 games with the CFL Ottawa Rough Riders), DE Reggie P. Lewis (2 years, 22 games with the Buccaneers), LB Dallas Hickman (6 years, 91 games with the Redskins), CB Mike Thomas (6 years, 77 games with the Redskins and Chargers) and SS Billy Cesare (5 years, 46 games with the Buccaneers, Dolphins and Lions),

The Stallions had some success in signing several of their 1983 draft picks to go along with Collier.  Guard Pat Saindon (8th round, Vanderbilt), nose tackle Charles Martin (15th round, Livingston College) and reserve guard Mike Turner (16th round, Louisiana State).  Martin would go on to play for the Green Bay Packers and was involved in an infamous bodyslam tackle of Chicago Bears QB Jim McMahon in 1986 at Soldier Field. They also signed two key territorial draft selections in defensive end Jackie Cline from Alabama and offensive tackle Pat Phenix from Ole' Miss.

The Stallions also signed a rookie free agent named Scott Norwood who would later be infamous as the Buffalo Bills kicker who missed a field goal in the dying minutes of the Super Bowl in 1990.

After dropping their opening game on a Monday night (9-7, at home to the Michigan Panthers) the Stallions rebounded on the road the following week with a 20–14 overtime victory in Oakland against the Invaders to record their first franchise win.

However, the Stallions struggled out of the gate with a 2–5 record as Coach Rollie Dotsch and his staff put a patchwork, blue-collar, run-oriented club together.

Prior to the Stallions' sixth game of the season, former Pittsburgh Steelers wide receiver Jim Smith (6 years, 73 games with the Steelers) was signed by Dotsch to add some punch to a listless receiving corps.  Smith did not disappoint as his arrival helped the offense almost immediately.  Dotsch was very familiar with Smith as they were members of two Super Bowl Championship clubs in the Steel City.

The turning point in the season, however, was during a home game in Week #8 (Sunday, April 24) against the Oakland Invaders when backup quarterback Bobby Lane took the reins of the Stallions offense from Collier, who struggled with injuries and inconsistency.

Lane's heroics won the game vs. Oakland and the Stallions went on to win four subsequent games that improved their record to a 7–5 mark.  However, the club managed to only win two of their last six games to finish with a 9–9 mark and a fourth-place finish in the Central Division.

All four teams in the USFL Central Division in 1983 were at .500 or above (Michigan 12–6, Chicago 12-6 and Tampa Bay 11-7 all recorded strong campaigns).

The biggest game of the 1983 season for the Stallions came in Week #11 on a Saturday night (May 14, 1983) when they defeated the visiting Los Angeles Express, 35–20, in front of the largest crowd of the year at Legion Field (42,212).  The crowd featured over 20,000 people from the families of local steel and Iron workers unions.

The following week, the Stallions went on the road and defeated the eventual USFL Champion Michigan Panthers, 23–20 at the Pontiac Silverdome.  The game was highlighted by a disputed touchdown late in the game when a Michigan defender intercepted a ball in the end zone, spiked the ball and had it recovered by a Stallions' player before the play was blown dead.

Birmingham finished the season as the top rushing club in the USFL with 3,017 yards on 701 carries, however, the Stallions ranked 11th in the 12-team loop with 2,999 yards passing.

Late in the season, the club also announced the signing of former Buffalo Bills running back Joe Cribbs, who would join the club at the start of the 1984 season.  Cribbs, who played his college ball locally for the Auburn Tigers, signed a three-year contract with the Stallions.

1983 opening-day roster

1983 Birmingham Stallions Schedule

Sources

1983 Birmingham Stallions Numerical Roster

1983 Birmingham Stallions Statistics

1983 Birmingham Stallions End-of-Season Roster

1984 season

With the off-season signing of former NFL'ers quarterback Cliff Stoudt, running back Joe Cribbs, full back Leon Perry, defensive end Dave Pureifory and CFL cornerback Ricky Ray, the Stallions outlook for the 1984 campaign was bright.

Coach Dotsch shored up several areas, including the defensive line where three players from the 1983 squad were let go.  Also added to the lineup was a college free agent in safety Chuck Clanton who burst onto the scene with the Stallions in 1984 as a major force on a re-build defense.

The Stallions also employed a re-vamped defense with a regular "Nickel" formation featuring, two linebackers and 5 defensive backs – one of the first defenses of its kind utilized in the USFL (the San Antonio Gunslingers were the other team to feature the nickel defense as well in 1984). They already had a reputation as a hard-hitting team, which was thought to be carried over from Dotsch's days with the Steelers.

The Stallions' first game of the 1984 campaign was before a league record 62,500 fans at Legion Field against another re-constructed club in the New Jersey Generals.  With the Generals arriving in town like a circus with new owner Donald Trump, running back Herschel Walker and quarterback Brian Sipe in tow, Birmingham was abuzz with anticipation for the new season.

The opening game against New Jersey was broadcast on national television on ABC, however, the Stallions were listless in a 17–6 loss to the Generals to start the season.

However, the game would mark the start of a nine-game unbeaten streak that took the Stallions into a May 6 contest at Legion Field with a 9–1 record against the 9-1 Philadelphia Stars.  In its biggest game since the opener against New Jersey, the Stallions came up flat in a 43-11 spanking at the hands of the Stars who would go on to win the 1984 USFL Championship.

The game against the Stars drew a crowd of 49,500, however, the loss sullied interest in the team for the rest of the season as the club averaged only averaged 27,000 fans per game for their last four home games, despite chalking up a 14–4 record.  The decline was also blamed on the USFL's decision in May to move to a fall schedule for the 1986 season – a scenario that transpired in several USFL markets.

With their 14–4 mark, the Stallions captured the Southern Division Championship and a berth in the USFL playoffs with a 35–20 win over the Memphis Showboats in Week #17 at a sold-out Liberty Bowl.

In the Eastern Conference Semi-Finals, the Stallions defeated their southern division rivals the Tampa Bay Bandits with a convincing 36–16 win at Legion Field in front of 32,000.

One week later, the Stallions dropped the Eastern Conference Championship, 20–10 to the Philadelphia Stars in a game played at Franklin Field.  The venue was moved to the University of Pennsylvania campus when Veterans Stadium was occupied by the Philadelphia Phillies.

1984 Birmingham Stallions Opening Day Roster

1984 Birmingham Stallions Schedule

Sources

1984 Birmingham Stallions End-of-Season Roster

1985 season

After having a very successful 1984 season and coming to within a win of the USFL Championship game, the Stallions entered 1985 with high hopes. However, the team was nearly derailed in mid-season. On March 4, ESM Government Securities, a Florida-based securities dealer owned by Tampa Bay Bandits co-owner Steve Arky, was raided and shut down by the Securities and Exchange Commission. The ESM raid, and Arky's subsequent suicide, triggered a massive run on Home State Savings Bank, the Cincinnati-based savings and loan Warner controlled, resulting in its seizure by Ohio regulators.

With most of his money tied up in either Home State or the Stallions, Warner was forced to give up control of the Stallions just days after Home State's collapse. The league had required its owners to post a $1.3 million letter of credit for just such an emergency. Unfortunately, the Stallions' $1.3 letter of credit was backed by Home State, rendering it worthless.

In response, team president Jerry Sklar urged the Stallions' limited partners to chip in more money, and persuaded the city government to buy a $100,000 stake in the team along with a $900,000 credit line. This allowed the Stallions to stay in business and remain in Birmingham.

More or less out of necessity, the Stallions exercised more fiscal responsibility in 1985 and made only minor upgrades to their roster in the off-season.  The only notable addition during the off-season was defensive tackle Doug Smith who was a 2nd round pick by the Houston Oilers in 1984.  Smith, an Auburn graduate, was a territorial selection of the Stallions in 1984, and signed with the Stallions after being unable to come to a contract agreement with the Oilers.

After acquiring the first overall pick in the 1985 USFL Open Draft, the Stallions selected a wide receiver from Mississippi Valley State University named Jerry Rice.  The USFL draft was held in January 1985, however, when the NFL Draft was held four months later, Rice was considered a "project" by several NFL scouting staffs and dropped to the 16th overall pick to the San Francisco 49ers.

Although Rice signed with the 49ers, credit should be given to GM Jerry Sklar and his staff for realizing the potential of Rice well ahead of most other professional scouting staffs.

With the USFL from 18 to 14 teams, the Stallions also acquired some solid depth in safety David Dumars from the Denver Gold, offensive tackle Phil McKinnely from the Memphis Showboats, linebacker Ken Kelley from the Chicago Blitz and defensive back Mickey Sutton from the Pittsburgh Maulers.

Birmingham opened the season, as they did in 1984, by hosting the New Jersey Generals at Legion Field.  The game featured the USFL debut of 1984 Heisman Trophy winner Doug Flutie at quarterback for the Generals.  In front of 34,785 at Legion Field, the Stallions controlled the majority of the game and won their opener, 38–28 over New Jersey.

The Stallions jumped out to a 5–1 record in 1985 and finished the regular season on a 6-1 clip to claim the Eastern Conference title and the #2 seed in the USFL Playoffs with a 13-5-0 mark.  Only the Oakland Invaders had a better record in 1985 with a 13-4-1 record.

Quarterback Cliff Stoudt had a solid season passing for 3,358 yards, 34 touchdowns and 19 interceptions.  Stoudt's 34 touchdown passes was second only to Houston's Jim Kelly who tossed for 39 majors in 1985.

Stoudt's primary target in 1985 was wide receiver Jim Smith who had a career year catching a USFL record 20 touchdown passes.  Smith caught 87 passes for a league leading 1,322 yards and was named to the USFL All-Star team.

Running back Joe Cribbs recorded his second consecutive 1,000+ yard season with 1,047 yards on 267 carries and 7 touchdowns.

Safety Chuck Clanton also set a professional football record with 16 interceptions in 1985 as he also added 275 returns yards and a major picking off passes.  The NFL record of 14 in a season was set in 1952 by Dick 'Night Train' Lane of the Los Angeles Rams.  The CFL record of 15 in a season was set in 1972 by Al Brenner of the Calgary Stampeders.

In the USFL Quarter-Final, the Stallions defeated the visiting Houston Gamblers 22–20, at Legion Field.

The following week, the Stallions hosted the defending champion, and nemesis, the Baltimore Stars at Legion Field.  After losing to the Stars in the Eastern Conference final in 1984, the Stallions were hoping to exact revenge, however, they dropped a 28-14 decision to Baltimore in what would eventually be Birmingham's last USFL game.

1985 Birmingham Stallions Opening Day Roster

1985 Birmingham Stallions Schedule

Sources

1985 Birmingham Stallions End of Season Roster

Single-season records
 Rushing attempts; 297 (1984), Joe Cribbs
 Rushing yards: 1467 (1984), Joe Cribbs
 Rushing TDs: 13 (1984), Leon Perry
 Receptions: 89 (1984), Jim Smith
 Receiving yards: 1607 (1984), Jim Smith (USFL record)
 Receiving TDs; 20 (1985), Jim Smith (USFL record)
 Pass Completions: 266 (1985), Cliff Stoudt
 Pass Attempts; 444 (1985), Cliff Stoudt
 Passing yards: 3188 (1985), Cliff Stoudt
 Passing TDs: 35 (1985), Cliff Stoudt
 Kickoff returns: 26 (1985), Paul Ott Carruth
 Kickoff return yards: 477 (1985), Paul Ott Carruth
 Kickoff return Avg: 23.2 (1984), Lonnie Johnson
 Punt returns: 33 (1985), Thad McFadden
 Punt return yards: 328 (1985), Thad McFadden
 Punt return Avg: 9.9 (1985), Thad McFadden
 Field Goals Made: 25 (1983), Scott Norwood
 Field Goal Attempts: 34 (1983), Scott Norwood
 Punts: 67 (1985), Bob Parsons
 Punt Yardage: 2626 (1985), Bob Parsons
 Punt Average: 41.4 (1983), Skip Johnston
 Tackles: 149 (1985), Herb Spencer
 Sacks: 10.0 (1984), Dave Pureifory
 Passes Defensed: 18 (1985), Chuck Clanton
 Fumbles Recoveries: 3 (1984), Mike Murphy
 Interceptions: 16 (1985), Chuck Clanton (USFL and Pro Football record)
 Interception yards: 275 (1985), Chuck Clanton (USFL record)

Season-by-season

|-
|1983 ||9||9|| 0 ||4th Central||--
|-
|1984 ||14 || 4 || 0 || 1st EC Southern ||Won Quarterfinal (Tampa Bay)Lost Semifinal (Philadelphia)
|-
|1985 || 13 || 5 || 0 || 1st EC || Won Quarterfinal (Houston)Lost Semifinal (Baltimore)
|-
!Totals || 38 || 20 || 0
|colspan="2"| (including playoffs)

After football
A few of those associated with the Stallions made their mark in Birmingham after the league folded:
 Joey Jones, who played wide receiver, coached football at two local high schools. In 2006, he became the first head football coach at Birmingham Southern College since 1939, when football was cancelled as a varsity sport. In 2008, after just one year at BSC, he returned to his hometown of Mobile and started the college football program at the University of South Alabama.
 Joe Cribbs returned to the NFL to finish out his football career. He returned to Birmingham to help those recovering from drug and alcohol addiction.
 Jim Hilyer, an assistant coach, went on to be the first ever football coach at the University of Alabama at Birmingham. He would also be an assistant to three other pro football teams to play in Birmingham. After football, he was an instructor in physical fitness at the Birmingham Police Academy.
 Buddy Aydelette is a city councilman with Trussville. Aydelette played offensive lineman for the Stallions and the University of Alabama.

Other history
The Stallions were the first pro football team to draft Jerry Rice.  They received the first overall pick in the 1985 USFL Draft, due to a trade with the Orlando Renegades.  Rice never played in Birmingham.

Among those considered to be Birmingham's coach were Bobby Bowden, Gene Stallings, and Hank Stram.

References

External links
 USFL.info - Birmingham Stallions
 BirminghamProSports.com
 Remember the USFL's Birmingham Stallions Page
 Our Sports Central's Birmingham Stallions Page

 
1982 establishments in Alabama
1986 disestablishments in Alabama